Eliphalet Wickes (April 1, 1769June 7, 1850) was an American politician and a member of the United States House of Representatives from New York.

He was born on April 1, 1769, in Huntington on Long Island in the Province of New York. During the American Revolution, he was employed as an express rider. He studied law, was admitted to the bar, and commenced practice in Jamaica, Long Island, New York. He was elected as a Democratic-Republican to the Ninth Congress, which met from March 4, 1805, to March 3, 1807.

He was appointed the first postmaster of Jamaica, Long Island, New York on July 1, 1797, and he served until April 1, 1806. He was re-appointed on January 1, 1807, and he served until April 27, 1835. He served as District Attorney of Queens County from 1818 to 1821; he also held a judicial appointment as master in chancery. He died in Troy, New York on June 7, 1850. He was interred in Oakwood Cemetery.

References

1769 births
1850 deaths
People from Queens, New York
People from Huntington, New York
New York (state) postmasters
Queens County (New York) District Attorneys
Masters in chancery
Democratic-Republican Party members of the United States House of Representatives from New York (state)
Burials at Oakwood Cemetery (Troy, New York)
19th-century American lawyers